Killer Queen is a community-oriented, real-time strategy platform arcade video game for up to ten players. The game was developed by Josh DeBonis and Nikita Mikros, the co-founders of BumbleBear Games. It was initially developed as a field game, but premiered in its arcade form in 2013 at New York University’s fourth annual No Quarter exhibition for indie arcade games.

The game is designed to be played by ten players on two arcade cabinets set side-by-side or back-to-back. Two teams of five players choose between multiple roles: Worker, Warrior or Queen. Teams fight for dominance through three avenues to victory: Economic, Military and Snail. A new game inspired by Killer Queen, called Killer Queen Black, was released on October 11, 2019 on Microsoft Windows and Nintendo Switch, on February 22, 2021 for Xbox One, a month later on March 30, 2021 for Google Stadia, and on June 10, 2021 for Amazon Luna.

Gameplay

Killer Queen is a team-based, competitive game pitting ten players in teams of five against each other. The two teams, Blue and Gold, choose one player to be the Queen while other players start as Workers. The Queen is the most powerful unit in the game, and can lead teams to victory or defeat. All other players start off as a drone, a non-attacking unit that can pick up berries found in the arena and take them to Transformation Gates or the team’s hive. Drones can transform either into a Speed Drone, who can move around faster, or a Warrior, which loses the Drone’s abilities to instead wield a sword and kill the enemy’s Drones, Warriors or Queen.

Transformation Gates start off unclaimed, but can be turned to one team’s color by a Queen of that color. Several Gates are found throughout the different arenas, a drone transforms to either a Warrior or Speed Drone by bringing a berry to an activated Gate corresponding to that character. Drones are easy to kill, but respawn infinitely. If a Warrior is killed, the player respawns as a Drone and must get to another Warrior gate to gain Warrior powers again. Queens have three lives, represented by three eggs in their hive, and a team loses the game once the third hatched Queen has died.

Economic Victory is attained by filling a team’s honeycomb hive with berries. Drones carry one berry at a time to their hive while dodging opposing Warrior and Queen attacks. Snail Victory is achieved by riding the slow-moving Snail at the bottom of the arena to one side in a tug-of-war-like back and forth battle. Opposing teams can slow down the snail by killing its Drone rider, sacrificing a Drone of their own (who will be eaten by the Snail, slowing its pace) or riding the snail back toward their side of the map. Military Victory is achieved when the opposing team’s Queen is killed three times by attacks from either Warriors or Queen.

To successfully attack an enemy Warrior or Queen, players must strike it from above or behind. This gameplay element is reminiscent of the arcade game Joust and emphasizes positioning and quick, reactive strategy. If players strike each other from the front, while on the same level, they bounce back and no damage is done. The community of players inspired by this game has developed a long list of tactics and strategies for victory, lending to the competitiveness of the game.

Development
Killer Queen went through several iterations on its journey to the arcade, starting off as a college rec league-like outdoor field game inspired by the scent trails of ants. DeBonis and Mikros premiered the field game at New York University’s Come Out & Play festival, where it won awards for “Most Strategic” and “Best in Fest.” After the success of the field game, the game grew into more of a passion project. Mikros and DeBonis - under the independent game studios Sortasoft and Smashworx - started developing the digital game alongside the field game in 2011. Iterations came and went, with one idea being a projected screen and 10 players holding retro NES controllers. It was when the two made a bet with NYU professor Charles J. Pratt, who thought the field game couldn’t be transformed into a successful multiplayer arcade game, that the structure of Killer Queen today started to take form. By 2013, DeBonis and Mikros had an early version of the arcade cabinet ready. With a commission from the NYU Game Center, the team dove into building the game’s cabinet and preparing the game for debut at the college’s fourth annual No Quarter exhibition.

The duo wanted to maintain the social aspects of the field game, and pared down the player count to 10 total. WIth five on each side, jammed close together jostling for space on the arcade machine’s control panel, the repeating theme of “Meet Thy Neighbor” flashing across the screen is fitting. After the debut, Mikros and DeBonis took the game on a tour of arcade and video game shows, including Indiecade, GDC, the Amusement Expo and more. As players praised the raucous, community-oriented gameplay, investors and locations operators took interest.

The game soon found itself intersecting with the growth of bar arcades, with Logan Arcade in Chicago becoming the first commercial home for an arcade version of Killer Queen. The game was a hit there, becoming popular enough to warrant an entire night dedicated to playing it each week, and popularizing a trend that would have many bar arcades hosting league nights for it, filling locations on otherwise less popular nights. Community became integral to the game, with leagues similar to the competitive pinball scene growing to include an eager new fan base. As multiple bar arcades reported success and revenues the team behind Killer Queen took it to the next level. They entered into the traditional arcade industry, looking to revitalize the space with modern, competitive gameplay in a traditional arcade cabinet. In 2016, Mikros and DeBonis contracted with Raw Thrills to build cabinets on a larger scale. The traditional arcade giant, headed by legendary designer Eugene Jarvis, made some changes to the cabinets and tweaks to the gameplay. The manufacturer upped the monitor size slightly, added retro style side art, included a tutorial for new players and added an AI system to fill in spots for groups less than 10 playing.

Development continues on the game, with new maps, gameplay tweaks and more released through patches and updates to owners of the now 90 some cabinets in locations nationwide.

Reception 
The arcade game was received well, finding success in bar arcades especially. It received multiple rewards, including the Developer’s Choice Award at 2013’s Indiecade and was a finalist at the Independent Games Festival in 2015.

Community 
As the cabinet reached more locations across the country, the growth of Killer Queen players happened organically, but not without help from community organizers nationwide. Because of the sheer numbers required to play, organizing something more than just one group of friends became necessary to keep a scene alive and thriving. Community organizers began coordinating on Facebook and Discord to share best practices, strategies and ways to entice players to join. League nights grew from small dedicated groups of friends returning to their local haunt weekly to play into crowded venues with Killer Queen at the center of all the action.

The stark physical reality of cramming 10 people around two cabinets meant conflict was sure to arise. But early on, community organizers prioritized non-toxic play, inviting anyone and everyone to the sticks to help keep the community healthy and grow the player base. Active communities grew quickly in Chicago, New York, Portland and many other cities. These groups of players didn’t reflect your average gamer, and included a larger than average percentage of female players. Competitive play was important, but what organizers soon realized was an inviting player base was more important. Star players only lasted as long as their welcome wasn’t worn out, and since the game was in person, side-by-side and face-to-face, the toxicity that plagues many online multiplayer games was engineered out of the communities by diligent organizers.

As scenes began to grow in cities, players became more and more interested in traveling to play. Self-organized, these teams showed up in other cities that hosted a Killer Queen cabinet for a weekend of tournament play in what became the beginnings of a more official competitive scene.

Esports/competitive play 
Early competitive play came in the form of community-organized tournaments, some of which were streamed on Youtube and Twitch. The first tournament happened in the same place the arcade version of the game debuted: No Quarter at New York University. Some 60 people showed up to the upbeat gathering. The idea spread to other cities, with players organizing alongside arcade owners to gather the city’s player base around one cabinet for tournament play.

The game soon became popular enough for DeBonis and Mikros to organize, with the help of their players, an official tournament: Bumblebash. Bumblebash 1 was hosted in November 2016, with teams from Chicago, Portland, New York, San Francisco, Phoenix, Kansas City, Columbus, Charlotte, Minneapolis and Austin coming to compete. Over 150 players spread across 33 teams traveled to play, and since the first Bumblebash, the numbers have only grown. Bumblebash 4 was the latest national tournament, held in 2019 in Chattanooga with over 300 attendees.

Competitive play and tournaments came to a halt in 2020 due to the COVID-19 pandemic, but both official and community-organized tournaments began to return in 2021. In November 2021, BumbleBear hosted BumbleBash: Remix as a draft tournament at the Midwest Gaming Classic in Milwaukee. The year's largest invitational tournament, GDC V in San Francisco, attracted over 100 players on 25 teams.

References

Further reading

External links
 Official website

2013 video games
Indie video games
Arcade video games
MacOS games
Real-time strategy video games
Nintendo Switch games
Windows games
Platform games
Video game remakes
Video games developed in the United States
Multiplayer video games
Xbox Cloud Gaming games
Xbox One games